Cayuse Pass (el. ) is a mountain pass in the Cascade Mountains in the state of Washington.

The intersection with State Route 123 is at the pass.

The pass carries State Route 410 and State Route 123 between Packwood and Enumclaw. Because of the high elevation, Cayuse Pass is usually closed in November due to very heavy snow and significant avalanche danger.

As part of the All-American Road program, Route 410 through Cayuse Pass has been designated by the U.S. government as the Chinook Scenic Byway.

External links
 WSDOT website for Cayuse pass

Mountain passes of Washington (state)
Mountain passes of the Cascades
Landforms of Pierce County, Washington
Transportation in Pierce County, Washington